Cosme, Cosmè, or Cosmé may refer to:

 Cosme (name), including a list of people with the given name or surname
 Cosme District, Churcampa province, Peru
 Tropical Storm Cosme (disambiguation), various storms

See also
 San Cosme (disambiguation)
 Cosmes, a French commune
 Cosmo (disambiguation)